This article presents a list of the historical events and publications of Australian literature during 2000.

Events

 Drylands by Thea Astley and Benang by Kim Scott were joint winners of the Miles Franklin Award

Major publications

Novels 
 Peter Carey, True History of the Kelly Gang
 Rodney Hall, The Day We Had Hitler Home
 Alex Miller, Conditions of Faith
 Frank Moorhouse, Dark Palace

Short story anthologies 
 Carmel Bird (editor), The Penguin Century of Australian Stories

Poetry 

 Dorothy Hewett and John Kinsela, Wheatlands

Children's and young adult fiction 
 Jaclyn Moriarty, Feeling Sorry for Celia
 Sonya Hartnett, Thursday's Child
 James Moloney, Touch Me
 John Marsden, Winter
 Shaun Tan, The Lost Thing

Plays
 Hannie Rayson, Life After George
 David Williamson
Face to Face
The Great Man

Non-fiction
 Brian Matthews, A Fine and Private Place
 Wendy McCarthy, Don't Fence Me In
 Margaret Scott, Changing Countries: On moving from one island to another

Honours
 Ray Parkin, "for service to Australian war literature through autobiographical works, and to historical research as author of HM Bark Endeavour

Deaths
A list, ordered by date of death (and, if the date is either unspecified or repeated, ordered alphabetically by surname) of deaths in 2000 of Australian literary figures, authors of written works or literature-related individuals follows, including year of birth.
 4 March – Michael Noonan, novelist and radio scriptwriter (born 1921)
 11 March – Gerald Glaskin, writer (born 1923)
 17 March – Jack Davis, playwright, poet and Indigenous rights campaigner (born 1917)
 6 May – Elizabeth O'Conner, novelist (born 1913)
 25 May – Elizabeth Durack, artist and writer (born 1915)
 22 June – John Joseph Jones, poet, folk singer, musician, playwright and theatre director (born 1930)
 25 June – Judith Wright, poet, environmentalist and campaigner for Aboriginal land rights (born 1915)
 3 July – Nancy Cato, historical novelist, biographer and poet (born 1917)
 13 July – A. D. Hope, poet and essayist (born 1907)
 10 August – Clement Semmler, author, literary critic, broadcaster and radio and television executive (born 1914)
 17 August – Leslie Rees, children's writer and dramatist (born 1905)
 1 November – Ian Moffitt, journalist and novelist (born 1926)

See also 
 2000 in Australia
 2000 in literature
 2000 in poetry
 List of years in literature
 List of years in Australian literature

References

2000 in Australia
Australian literature by year
20th-century Australian literature
2000 in literature